Kannal is a village in the Belgaum district of kannal,Karnataka, India. is the location of the Sri Madhavanand Matha temple, Shree Sidrameshwar temple, Hanuman temple, Shree Durgadevi temple, and Sri Basaveshwara temple.

References

Villages in Belagavi district